is a retired female badminton player of Japan who won Japanese national and international titles in the late 1970s and the 1980s. She is the mother of badminton player Kenichi Tago.

Career
In 1980 she won women's singles at the Danish Open, women's singles and doubles at the Swedish Open, and a bronze medal at the 1980 IBF World Championships in women's doubles with Atsuko Tokuda. She was a member of world champion Japanese Uber Cup (women's international) teams in 1978 and in 1981. She was also the champion at 1979 Badminton World Cup in women's doubles category with partner Emiko Ueno.

Achievements

World Championships

World Cup

Asian Games

IBF World Grand Prix 
The World Badminton Grand Prix sanctioned by International Badminton Federation (IBF) from 1983 to 2006.

International tournaments

References 

Japanese female badminton players
Living people
Asian Games medalists in badminton
Badminton players at the 1978 Asian Games
Badminton players at the 1982 Asian Games
Badminton players at the 1986 Asian Games
Asian Games silver medalists for Japan
Asian Games bronze medalists for Japan
Medalists at the 1978 Asian Games
Medalists at the 1982 Asian Games
Medalists at the 1986 Asian Games
Year of birth missing (living people)